Chet R. Allen (May 6, 1939 – June 17, 1984) was an American child actor known for his role as Amahl in Gian Carlo Menotti's Amahl and the Night Visitors, the first opera written for television, which he made with the NBC Opera Theatre.

Allen was born in Chillicothe, Ohio, and later moved to Columbus, Ohio.  At the time he was selected as Amahl, Allen was a soprano in the Columbus Boychoir, founded in Columbus. He reprised the role of Amahl in April 1952 with the New York City Opera, conducted by Thomas Schippers.

In 1953, Allen starred with Dan Dailey in the film Meet Me at the Fair in the role of 14-year-old Tad Bayliss. That same year, he played the young teenager Jerry Bonino in the short-lived NBC series Bonino, starring Ezio Pinza as a recently widowed  Italian-American opera singer Babbo Bonino, undertaking the rearing of his eight children. Mary Wickes co-starred as Martha the housekeeper.

Death
In 1984, at the age of forty-five, Allen committed suicide by taking five times the fatal dosage of an anti-depressant.

References

External links
 
 

1939 births
1984 suicides
20th-century American male actors
20th-century American male opera singers
American male child actors
American male film actors
American male television actors
Boy sopranos
Drug-related suicides in Ohio
Male actors from Ohio
People from Chillicothe, Ohio
Male actors from Columbus, Ohio
Singers from Ohio
Classical musicians from Ohio